Khanapur Atpadi was one of the assembly segments in Maharashtra Vidhan Sabha in India, from 1978 to 2004 elections. Until 1972 elections, 'Khanapur' vidhan sabha seat existed. Then the boundaries of assembly segments were redrawn, and the name of Khanapur seat changed to 'Khanapur Atpadi'. In 2008, the boundaries were redrawn again, and the name of the seat reverted to just Khanapur.

See also
 Khanapur Assembly constituency

References

Former assembly constituencies of Maharashtra